Jørn Steffensen (born 20 September 1944) is a Danish modern pentathlete. He competed at the 1968, 1972 and 1976 Summer Olympics.

References

External links
 

1944 births
Living people
Danish male modern pentathletes
Olympic modern pentathletes of Denmark
Modern pentathletes at the 1968 Summer Olympics
Modern pentathletes at the 1972 Summer Olympics
Modern pentathletes at the 1976 Summer Olympics
People from Helsingør
Sportspeople from the Capital Region of Denmark